Charles Herbert Clemens Jr. (born 15 August 1939 in Dayton, Ohio) is an American mathematician, specializing in complex algebraic geometry.

Biography
Clemens received in 1961 his bachelor's degree from College of the Holy Cross and in 1966 his Ph.D. from the University of California, Berkeley under Phillip Griffiths with thesis Picard–Lefschetz Theorem for Families of Algebraic Varieties Acquiring Certain Singularities. In 1970 he became an assistant professor at Columbia University and went on to become an associate professor before leaving in 1975 to become an associate professor at the University of Utah where he became a full professor in 1976 and a Distinguished Professor in 2001.  In 2002 he left Utah to become a professor of mathematics and mathematics education at the Ohio State University.

Clemens was a visiting scholar at the Institute for Advanced Study from September 1968 to March 1970 and from September 2001 to June 2003. He was an invited speaker at the International Congress of Mathematicians in 1976 at Vancouver and in 1986 at Berkeley and gave a talk Curves on higher dimensional complex projective manifolds. For the academic year 1974–1975 he was a Sloan Fellow.

In 1972 Clemens and Griffiths proved that a cubic three-fold is in general not a rational variety, providing an example for three dimensions that unirationality does not imply rationality. In 1986 Clemens was an editor of the Pacific Journal of Mathematics.

He married in 1983 and has three children.

Selected publications

Articles

Books
 
 as editor with: János Kollár: 
 with Michael A. Clemens: Geometry for the class room, Springer 1991
 as editor with Spencer Bloch and others:  Algebraic Geometry: Bowdoin 1985, 2 vols., AMS 1987;  
 as co-contributor with Alessio Corti to the book authored by János Kollár, and Shigefumi Mori: Birational geometry of algebraic varieties, Cambridge University Press 1998.

References

External links
 

1939 births
Living people
20th-century American mathematicians
21st-century American mathematicians
University of California, Berkeley alumni
Columbia University faculty
University of Utah faculty
Institute for Advanced Study visiting scholars
People from Dayton, Ohio
Sloan Research Fellows
Mathematicians from Ohio
Algebraic geometers
College of the Holy Cross alumni